Morieux (Gallo: Morioec) is a former commune in the Côtes-d'Armor department of Brittany in northwestern France. On 1 January 2019, it was merged into the new commune Lamballe-Armor.

Population

People from Morieux are called morivains in French.

See also
Communes of the Côtes-d'Armor department

References

External links

Former communes of Côtes-d'Armor